Route 54 may refer to:

Route 54 (MTA Maryland), a public bus route in Baltimore, Maryland and its suburbs
Dublin Bus (No. 54A), a bus route in Dublin, Ireland
London Buses route 54
Route 54 (WMATA), a public bus route in Washington, D.C.

See also
List of highways numbered 54

54